The Compulsory Purchase Act 1965 (c 56) is an Act of Parliament of the United Kingdom, which concerns English land law and compulsory purchase.

Contents
The Act sets conditions for a compulsory purchase to be made.

See also

Compulsory purchase order
English land law
Eminent domain
Re Ellenborough Park [1955] EWCA Civ 4, [1956] Ch 131

References
K Gray and SF Gray, Land Law (7th edn 2011) Ch 11
K Gray and S Gray, ‘Private Property and Public Propriety’, in J McLean (ed), Property and the Constitution (Hart 1999) 36-7

United Kingdom Acts of Parliament 1965
Property law of the United Kingdom